Second Sighting is the third solo album by Ace Frehley and last to use the Frehley's Comet moniker.

Second Sighting was recorded with new drummer Jamie Oldaker, who had previously worked with Bob Seger and Eric Clapton. He replaced Billy Ward, who was in the videos and part of the tour for the previous album replacing Anton Fig, who would return for 1989's Trouble Walkin'. This makes Second Sighting the only Frehley solo album or project (excluding compilations) to not feature Fig at this point.

"Dancin' with Danger" is a cover version of a song recorded by the Canadian band Streetheart, which had featured future Loverboy members Paul Dean and Matt Frenette. Although the songwriting credits list Frehley and Dana Strum, the music and lyrics are very similar to the original version. 

"Insane" and "It's Over Now" were released as singles with corresponding music videos. Both singles failed to chart.

UK-based company Rock Candy Records reissued this album on CD in 2013.

Track listing

Personnel
Frehley's Comet
Ace Frehley - guitars, lead and backing vocals
Tod Howarth - guitars, keyboards, lead and backing vocals
John Regan - bass guitar, backing vocals
Jamie Oldaker - drums, backing vocals

Additional musicians
Gordon G.G. Gebert - sequencing assistance on "Dancin' with Danger"

Production
Scott Mabuchi - producer, engineer, mixing at Right Track Recording, New York City
Michael Reiter - assistant engineer
Debi Cornish - mixing assistant
George Marino - mastering at Sterling Sound, New York City
Jon and Marsha Zazula, Eddie Trunk - executive producers

Charts

References

1988 albums
Ace Frehley albums
Megaforce Records albums
Glam metal albums